Michael Simms Jr (born July 26, 1974) is an American former professional boxer who competed from 2000 to 2012. As an amateur, he won a gold medal at the 1999 World Championships at light heavyweight.

Amateur career
Simms won the tournament in Houston 1999 by beating David Haye 8-2, Humberto Savigne of Cuba 5-1, defeating Ali Ismayilov of Azerbaijan by 7-5 and getting a controversial 3-3 (countback 33-26) decision over John Dovi of France in the final.

A year later, Simms was dropped from the Olympics 2000 team for breaches of discipline, and replaced with Olanda Anderson.

Professional career
He turned pro in 2000 but disappointed displaying a world class chin but moderate power and questionable work ethic.
He drew with undefeated Felix Cora Jr. in 2003, then lost to undefeated heavyweight Nurlan Meirmanov, the rematch with Cora in 2004, undefeated cruiser Vadim Tokarev, Ola Afolabi (9-1) and undefeated Marco Huck in 2005.
In 2007 he lost to Louis Azille and undefeated heavyweight Roman Greenberg.

Professional boxing record

|-
|align="center" colspan=8|22 Wins (14 knockouts, 8 decisions), 16 Losses (2 knockouts, 14 decisions), 2 Draws 
|-
| align="center" style="border-style: none none solid solid; background: #e3e3e3"|Result
| align="center" style="border-style: none none solid solid; background: #e3e3e3"|Record
| align="center" style="border-style: none none solid solid; background: #e3e3e3"|Opponent
| align="center" style="border-style: none none solid solid; background: #e3e3e3"|Type
| align="center" style="border-style: none none solid solid; background: #e3e3e3"|Round
| align="center" style="border-style: none none solid solid; background: #e3e3e3"|Date
| align="center" style="border-style: none none solid solid; background: #e3e3e3"|Location
| align="center" style="border-style: none none solid solid; background: #e3e3e3"|Notes
|-align=center
|Loss
|
|align=left| Mateusz Masternak
|TKO
|4
|04/02/2012
|align=left| Fraport Arena, Frankfurt
|align=left|
|-
|Win
|
|align=left| Leo Bercier
|TKO
|5
|05/11/2011
|align=left| Thunder Valley Casino Resort, Lincoln, California
|align=left|
|-
|Loss
|
|align=left| Rakhim Chakhkiyev
|KO
|4
|24/09/2011
|align=left| Dima-Sportcenter, Hamburg
|align=left|
|-
|Loss
|
|align=left| Anatoliy Dudchenko
|UD
|6
|03/06/2011
|align=left| Warner Center Marriott, Woodland Hills, California
|align=left|
|-
|Loss
|
|align=left| Alexander Frenkel
|UD
|8
|13/03/2010
|align=left| Max-Schmeling-Halle, Berlin
|align=left|
|-
|Win
|
|align=left| Martin Kempf
|UD
|8
|05/12/2009
|align=left| Arena Ludwigsburg, Ludwigsburg
|align=left|
|-
|Loss
|
|align=left| Matt Godfrey
|SD
|10
|12/09/2009
|align=left| Red Lion Hotel, Sacramento, California
|align=left|
|-
|Draw
|
|align=left| Kelvin Davis
|PTS
|6
|07/08/2009
|align=left| Red Lion Hotel, Sacramento, California
|align=left|
|-
|Loss
|
|align=left| Troy Ross
|UD
|10
|19/06/2009
|align=left| Bell Centre, Montreal, Quebec
|align=left|
|-
|Loss
|
|align=left| Yoan Pablo Hernandez
|MD
|8
|25/10/2008
|align=left| Weser-Ems-Halle, Oldenburg
|align=left|
|-
|Win
|
|align=left| Derrick Harmon
|UD
|6
|15/05/2008
|align=left| Red Lion Hotel, Sacramento, California
|align=left|
|-
|Loss
|
|align=left| Grigory Drozd
|UD
|8
|23/02/2008
|align=left| DIVS, Ekaterinburg
|align=left|
|-
|Loss
|
|align=left| Damian Norris
|SD
|10
|07/02/2008
|align=left| Red Lion Hotel, Sacramento, California
|align=left|
|-
|Loss
|
|align=left| Roman Greenberg
|UD
|10
|10/03/2007
|align=left| Madison Square Garden, New York City
|align=left|
|-
|Loss
|
|align=left| Louis Azille
|UD
|8
|22/02/2007
|align=left| Radisson Hotel, Sacramento, California
|align=left|
|-
|Loss
|
|align=left| Marco Huck
|UD
|8
|17/12/2005
|align=left| Max-Schmeling-Halle, Berlin
|align=left|
|-
|Win
|
|align=left| Willie Chapman
|UD
|6
|30/09/2005
|align=left| Cache Creek Casino Resort, Brooks, California
|align=left|
|-
|Win
|
|align=left| David Vedder
|UD
|8
|26/08/2005
|align=left| Radisson Hotel, Sacramento, California
|align=left|
|-
|Loss
|
|align=left| Ola Afolabi
|UD
|8
|19/08/2005
|align=left| Gold Coast Hotel and Casino, Las Vegas, Nevada
|align=left|
|-
|Win
|
|align=left| Troy Beets
|UD
|10
|21/07/2005
|align=left| ARCO Arena, Sacramento, California
|align=left|
|-
|Loss
|
|align=left| Vadim Tokarev
|UD
|10
|13/05/2005
|align=left| Kazan Sports Hall, Kazan
|align=left|
|-
|Win
|
|align=left| Jonathan Young
|UD
|8
|29/04/2005
|align=left| Radisson Hotel, Sacramento, California
|align=left|
|-
|Win
|
|align=left| Joseph Kiwanuka
|RTD
|8
|10/12/2004
|align=left| ARCO Arena, Sacramento, California
|align=left|
|-
|Win
|
|align=left| Victor Maciel
|KO
|1
|14/10/2004
|align=left| ARCO Arena, Sacramento, California
|align=left|
|-
|Loss
|
|align=left| Felix Cora, Jr.
|MD
|12
|25/06/2004
|align=left| Ramada Inn, Rosemont, Illinois
|align=left|
|-
|Win
|
|align=left| Marcelino Novaes
|TKO
|6
|27/03/2004
|align=left| ARCO Arena, Stateline, Nevada
|align=left|
|-
|Loss
|
|align=left| Yanqui Diaz
|MD
|6
|21/02/2004
|align=left| City Center Pavilion, Reno, Nevada
|align=left|
|-
|Draw
|
|align=left| Felix Cora, Jr.
|PTS
|10
|15/03/2003
|align=left| UIC Pavilion, Chicago, Illinois
|align=left|
|-
|Win
|
|align=left| Wesley Martin
|KO
|2
|01/11/2002
|align=left| ARCO Arena, Sacramento, California
|align=left|
|-
|Win
|
|align=left| Miguel Aquila
|RTD
|4
|24/05/2002
|align=left| Feather Falls Casino, Oroville, California
|align=left|
|-
|Win
|
|align=left| Tracy Barrios
|TKO
|4
|29/03/2002
|align=left| Radisson Hotel, Sacramento, California
|align=left|
|-
|Win
|
|align=left| Ali Sanchez
|TKO
|3
|19/12/2001
|align=left| Feather Falls Casino, Oroville, California
|align=left|
|-
|Win
|
|align=left| Reggie Roberts
|UD
|10
|07/09/2001
|align=left| Radisson Hotel, Sacramento, California
|align=left|
|-
|Win
|
|align=left| Richard Curtis
|TKO
|1
|21/07/2001
|align=left| Feather Falls Casino, Oroville, California
|align=left|
|-
|Win
|
|align=left| Maximo Martinez
|KO
|2
|22/06/2001
|align=left| Vallejo, California
|align=left|
|-
|Win
|
|align=left| Kevin Gilchrist
|TKO
|1
|27/04/2001
|align=left| Caesars Tahoe, Stateline, Nevada
|align=left|
|-
|Win
|
|align=left| Kevin Gilchrist
|KO
|2
|11/03/2001
|align=left| Feather Falls Casino, Oroville, California
|align=left|
|-
|Win
|
|align=left| Marcus Harvey
|KO
|2
|19/01/2001
|align=left| ARCO Arena, Sacramento, California
|align=left|
|-
|Win
|
|align=left| Jose Carlos Gonzalez
|KO
|2
|27/10/2000
|align=left| Feather Falls Casino, Oroville, California
|align=left|
|-
|Win
|
|align=left| Jesus Mayorga
|MD
|4
|19/08/2000
|align=left| Feather Falls Casino, Oroville, California
|align=left|
|}

External links

1974 births
Living people
Light-heavyweight boxers
Boxers from Sacramento, California
World boxing champions
Winners of the United States Championship for amateur boxers
National Golden Gloves champions
American male boxers
AIBA World Boxing Championships medalists